German submarine U-475 was a Type VIIC U-boat of Nazi Germany's Kriegsmarine during World War II.

She carried out four patrols. She damaged one warship.

She was scuttled on 3 May 1945 and broken up in 1947.

Design
German Type VIIC submarines were preceded by the shorter Type VIIB submarines. U-475 had a displacement of  when at the surface and  while submerged. She had two shafts and two  propellers.

U-475 was fitted with five  torpedo tubes (four fitted at the bow and one at the stern), fourteen torpedoes, one  SK C/35 naval gun, (220 rounds), one  Flak M42 and two twin  C/30 anti-aircraft guns. The boat had a complement of between forty-four and sixty.

Armament

FLAK weaponry
U-475 was mounted with two 2cm Flak C38 in a M 43U Zwilling mount with short folding shield on the upper Wintergarten. The M 43U mount was used on a number of U-boats (and ).

Service history
The submarine was laid down on 5 September 1942 in the Deutsche Werke, Kiel as yard number 306, launched on 28 May 1943 and commissioned on 7 July under the command of Kapitänleutnant Otto Stoeffler.

She served with the 5th U-boat Flotilla from 7 July 1943 for training and was transferred to the 8th flotilla from 1 August 1944 for operations. She was reassigned to the 4th flotilla on 16 February 1945.

First patrol
U-475s first patrol was preceded by a short journey from Kiel in Germany to Helsinki in Finland. The patrol itself, split into four parts, commenced with her departure from Helsinki on 11 July 1944. On the 28th she damaged the Soviet patrol craft MO-107 in Viborg Bay.

Second patrol
Her second foray was relatively uneventful – starting in Danzig (now Gdansk) on 14 October 1944. She returned to Danzig on 17 November.

Third patrol
The submarine steamed as far north as a point east of Stockholm before returning to Danzig (on 4 December 1944).

Fourth patrol
The boat's fourth sortie also started and finished in Danzig and at 54 days duration, was her longest.

Fate
U-475 had moved from Danzig to Kiel in March 1945. She was scuttled on 3 May 1945 at Kiel-Wik. The wreck was broken up in 1947.

Summary of raiding history

References

Notes

Citations

Bibliography

External links

German Type VIIC submarines
U-boats commissioned in 1943
1943 ships
Ships built in Kiel
World War II submarines of Germany
Operation Regenbogen (U-boat)
Maritime incidents in May 1945